Recep Adanır (3 May 1929 – 20 May 2017) was a Turkish professional footballer who played most of his career with Beşiktaş, the club he managed following his retirement. He also played for Ankaragücü, Kasımpaşa, Galatasaray and Karagümrük. Adnıir died on 20 May 2017, aged 88.

International career
Adanır made 10 appearances for the senior Turkey national football team.

Individual
Beşiktaş J.K. Squads of Century (Silver Team)

References

External links

1929 births
2017 deaths
Sportspeople from Ankara
Turkish footballers
Turkey international footballers
Galatasaray S.K. footballers
Kasımpaşa S.K. footballers
Beşiktaş J.K. footballers
Beşiktaş J.K. managers
Turkish football managers
Turkey under-21 international footballers
Association football midfielders